TurtleBot is a personal robot kit with open source software. It was created at Willow Garage by Melonee Wise and Tully Foote in November 2010.

The TurtleBot kit consists of a mobile base, a 3D Sensor, a laptop computer, and the TurtleBot mounting hardware kit. In addition to the kit, the TurtleBot SDK is available online.

Technology

TurtleBot 1 
TurtleBot 1 consists of an iRobot Create base, a 3000 mAh battery pack, a TurtleBot power board with gyro, a Kinect sensor, an Asus 1215N laptop with a dual core processor, and a hardware mounting kit attaching everything together and adding future sensors.

TurtleBot 2 

TurtleBot 2 consists of an YUJIN Kobuki base, a 2200 mAh battery pack, a Kinect sensor, an Asus 1215N laptop with a dual core processor, fast charger, and a hardware mounting kit attaching everything together and adding future sensors.

TurtleBot 3 

Turtlebot 3, announced and developed in collaboration with ROBOTIS and Open Source Robotics Foundation, is the smallest and cheapest of its generation. It has outstanding structural expansion capability due to ROBOTIS’ renowned modular structure with the DYNAMIXEL.

Community
TurtleBot has been used by research labs for doing multi-robot research and human robot interaction research. Many universities are also using the TurtleBot to teach introductory robotics courses.

Licensing 
TurtleBot is a licensed trademark that is maintained by the Open Source Robotics Foundation. The Open Source Robotics Foundation licenses the use of the TurtleBot trademark for manufacturing and distributing TurtleBot branded products.

References

External links 
 
 TurtleBot Youtube Channel
 TurtleBot GitHub
 Robotis and OSRF Announce TurtleBot 3: Smaller, Cheaper, and Modular
 Hands-on With TurtleBot 3, a Powerful Little Robot for Learning ROS

Open-source robots